The Merchant of Venice is a 1916 British silent drama film directed by Walter West and starring Matheson Lang, Hutin Britton, Ernest Caselli. It is an adaptation of William Shakespeare's play The Merchant of Venice.

Production
The film was made by Broadwest. The company hired the complete stage cast of the play and filmed at Walthamstow Studios using largely natural light. The film marked the screen debut of Matheson Lang who went on to become one of the leading British actors of the 1920s. It was not a success.

Cast
Matheson Lang as Shylock 
Hutin Britton as Portia 
Ernest Caselli as Lorenzo 
Kathleen Hazel Jones as Jessica 
George Morgan as Lancelot 
Terence O'Brien as Tubal 
George Skillan as Antonio 
Joseph Tozer as Bassanio 
Marguerite Westlake as Nerissa

References

External links

1910s historical drama films
British historical drama films
British silent feature films
Films directed by Walter West
British films based on plays
Films based on The Merchant of Venice
Broadwest films
British black-and-white films
1916 drama films
1910s British films
Silent drama films
1910s English-language films